Novačani is a small village located in the northern part of Veles Municipality in North Macedonia.

Demographics
According to the 2002 census, the village had a total of 5 inhabitants. Ethnic groups in the village include:

Macedonians 5

References

Villages in Veles Municipality